Andrew Rovenko (born 1978) is an Australian photographer of Ukrainian origin who is based in Melbourne. He is known for his award-winning Rocketgirl Chronicles series that was captured in Victoria's coronavirus lockdown. Rovenko was named 2021 Australian Photographer of the Year by the Australian Photography Magazine as well as 2022 Australasia's Top Emerging Photographer (Portrait) by the Capture Magazine

Early life and education 
Rovenko was born and raised in Odessa, Ukraine and moved to Australia in his mid 20s. He was noticed for his amateur photography first, which led to him being invited to work as a freelance magazine photographer, where he gained professional experience before switching back to personal projects

Rocketgirl Chronicles 
The Rocketgirl Chronicles is a series of images featuring Rovenko's young daughter in a home-made astronaut suit designed by his wife. With the first photographs originally intended as family memories, documenting the daily walks within the permitted radius under the restrictions of Melbourne's prolonged lockdown, they quickly found resonance both locally and abroad, with high-profile publications including Vogue and Rolling Stone, being featured in exhibitions in Australia, Italy and New York and receiving multiple photography awards.

The photograph from the series titled "The Shuttle" was selected as the cover for British Journal of Photography "Portrait of Humanity" - a yearly publication of remarkable portraits from around the world.

With the author being a practitioner of traditional photography workflow, the series was captured on medium format film using Mamiya RZ67 camera.

Exhibitions 

 2023 Valid World Hall Gallery, Barcelona, Spain
 2023 FotoZA Gallery, Johannesburg, South Africa
 2023 Pictura Gallery, Bloomington, US
 2023 The David Roche Foundation House Museum, Adelaide, South Australia
 2023 Noosa Regional Gallery, Queensland, Australia
 2022 Head On Photo Festival, Sydney
 2022 National Photographic Portrait Prize (National Portrait Gallery of Australia)
 2022 Riaperture, Ferrara, Italy
 2022 Photoville, New York City
 2022 Wyndham Art Prize, Melbourne
 2022 OptiKA, Kingston Arts Centre, Melbourne
 2021 Ilford CCP Salon, Centre for Contemporary Photography, Melbourne

Awards 
 Australian Photography Magazine Photographer of the Year, 2021 – Overall Winner, Portrait Category Winner
 Capture Magazine Australasia's Top Emerging Photographer, 2022 – Portrait Category Winner, Overall Runner-up
 International Photography Awards, 2022 – 1st place / Analog / Film/Portrait
 Fine Art Photo Awards, 2022 – Conceptual Category Winner
 Tokyo International Foto Awards, 2022 – Fine Art Winner
 Life Framer Award, Youthhood, 2022 – 2nd Prize
 Bluethumb Art Prize, 2021 – Photography Category Runner-up
 National Portrait Photographic Prize 2022 – Finalist
 Kuala Lumpur International Photographic Prize 2022 – Finalist
 Wyndham Art Prize, 2022 – Finalist
 IMA Next, Japan, 2022 – Finalist
 OptiKA Award, 2022 – Finalist

References

Australian photographers
Photographers from Melbourne
1978 births
Living people